Shahbazpur is a union parishad under Sarail Upazila of Brahmanbaria District in the Chittagong Division of eastern Bangladesh.

Geography

Demographics
According to the 2011 Bangladesh census, Shahbazpur Union had 5,606 households and a population of 29,757. The literacy rate (age 7 and over) was 47.1%, compared to the national average of 51.8%. 53.8% of the employed population was engaged in agricultural work.

Administration
Shahbazpur Union is divided into 4 mauzas: Bara Dhitpur, Jadabpur, Noagoan, and Sahbazpur.

Transport
Shahbazpur Union is on the N2 national highway connecting Dhaka and Sylhet.

Education
According to Banglapedia, Shahbazpur Multilateral High School, founded in 1907, is a notable secondary school.

Notable People
 Nurul Amin, Former Prime Minister of Pakistan during Bangladesh Liberation War.

References

Populated places in Brahmanbaria District
Unions of Sarail Upazila